Pokrov is the name of several inhabited localities in Russia.

Kaluga Oblast
As of 2010, six rural localities in Kaluga Oblast bear this name:
Pokrov, Babyninsky District, Kaluga Oblast, a village in Babyninsky District
Pokrov (Sovkhoz Chkalovsky Rural Settlement), Dzerzhinsky District, Kaluga Oblast, a village in Dzerzhinsky District; municipally, a part of Sovkhoz Chkalovsky Rural Settlement of that district
Pokrov (Ugorskaya Rural Settlement), Dzerzhinsky District, Kaluga Oblast, a village in Dzerzhinsky District; municipally, a part of Ugorskaya Rural Settlement of that district
Pokrov, Kirovsky District, Kaluga Oblast, a village in Kirovsky District
Pokrov, Meshchovsky District, Kaluga Oblast, a selo in Meshchovsky District
Pokrov, Zhukovsky District, Kaluga Oblast, a selo in Zhukovsky District

Kostroma Oblast
As of 2010, one rural locality in Kostroma Oblast bears this name:
Pokrov, Kostroma Oblast, a selo in Lapshinskoye Settlement of Vokhomsky District

Moscow Oblast
As of 2010, five rural localities in Moscow Oblast bear this name:
Pokrov, Chekhovsky District, Moscow Oblast, a village in Stremilovskoye Rural Settlement of Chekhovsky District
Pokrov, Klinsky District, Moscow Oblast, a village under the administrative jurisdiction of the town of Klin, Klinsky District
Pokrov, Podolsky District, Moscow Oblast, a selo in Strelkovskoye Rural Settlement of Podolsky District
Pokrov, Ruzsky District, Moscow Oblast, a village in Ivanovskoye Rural Settlement of Ruzsky District
Pokrov, Solnechnogorsky District, Moscow Oblast, a village in Lunevskoye Rural Settlement of Solnechnogorsky District

Nizhny Novgorod Oblast
As of 2010, three rural localities in Nizhny Novgorod Oblast bear this name:
Pokrov, Gaginsky District, Nizhny Novgorod Oblast, a selo in Pokrovsky Selsoviet of Gaginsky District
Pokrov, Knyagininsky District, Nizhny Novgorod Oblast, a selo in Vozrozhdensky Selsoviet of Knyagininsky District
Pokrov, Navashinsky District, Nizhny Novgorod Oblast, a village in Bolsheokulovsky Selsoviet of Navashinsky District

Novgorod Oblast
As of 2010, one rural locality in Novgorod Oblast bears this name:
Pokrov, Novgorod Oblast, a village in Polnovskoye Settlement of Demyansky District

Smolensk Oblast
As of 2010, two rural localities in Smolensk Oblast bear this name:
Pokrov, Gagarinsky District, Smolensk Oblast, a village in Pokrovskoye Rural Settlement of Gagarinsky District
Pokrov, Vyazemsky District, Smolensk Oblast, a village in Kaydakovskoye Rural Settlement of Vyazemsky District

Tver Oblast
As of 2010, five rural localities in Tver Oblast bear this name:
Pokrov, Maksatikhinsky District, Tver Oblast, a village in Maksatikhinsky District
Pokrov (Molokovskoye Rural Settlement), Molokovsky District, Tver Oblast, a village in Molokovsky District; municipally, a part of Molokovskoye Rural Settlement of that district
Pokrov (Akhmatovskoye Rural Settlement), Molokovsky District, Tver Oblast, a village in Molokovsky District; municipally, a part of Akhmatovskoye Rural Settlement of that district
Pokrov, Oleninsky District, Tver Oblast, a village in Oleninsky District
Pokrov, Zubtsovsky District, Tver Oblast, a village in Zubtsovsky District

Vladimir Oblast
As of 2010, two inhabited localities in Vladimir Oblast bear this name:
Pokrov, Vladimir Oblast, a town in Petushinsky District
Pokrov, Alexandrovsky District, Vladimir Oblast, a rural locality (a village) in Alexandrovsky District

Vologda Oblast
As of 2010, one rural locality in Vologda Oblast bears this name:
Pokrov, Vologda Oblast, a selo in Abakanovsky Selsoviet of Cherepovetsky District

Yaroslavl Oblast
As of 2010, five rural localities in Yaroslavl Oblast bear this name:
Pokrov, Fedurinsky Rural Okrug, Danilovsky District, Yaroslavl Oblast, a village in Fedurinsky Rural Okrug of Danilovsky District
Pokrov, Pokrovsky Rural Okrug, Danilovsky District, Yaroslavl Oblast, a selo in Pokrovsky Rural Okrug of Danilovsky District
Pokrov, Lyubimsky District, Yaroslavl Oblast, a selo in Pokrovsky Rural Okrug of Lyubimsky District
Pokrov, Rostovsky District, Yaroslavl Oblast, a village in Itlarsky Rural Okrug of Rostovsky District
Pokrov, Rybinsky District, Yaroslavl Oblast, a selo in Pokrovsky Rural Okrug of Rybinsky District